The Harvey Girls is a 1946 Technicolor American musical film produced by Arthur Freed for Metro-Goldwyn-Mayer. It is based on the 1942 novel of the same name by Samuel Hopkins Adams, about Fred Harvey's Harvey House waitresses. Directed by George Sidney, the film stars Judy Garland and features John Hodiak, Ray Bolger, and Angela Lansbury, as well as Preston Foster, Virginia O'Brien, Kenny Baker, Marjorie Main  and Chill Wills. Future star Cyd Charisse appears in her first speaking role on film.

The Harvey Girls won an Academy Award for Best Original Song for "On the Atchison, Topeka and the Santa Fe", written by Harry Warren and Johnny Mercer.

Plot
In the 1890s, a group of "Harvey Girls" – new waitresses for Fred Harvey's pioneering chain of Harvey House restaurants – travels on the Atchison, Topeka & Santa Fe Railway to the American Southwest town of Sandrock. On the trip they meet Susan Bradley, who is travelling to the same town to marry the man whose beautiful letters she received when she answered a "lonely-hearts" ad. 

Unfortunately, when she arrives, her husband-to-be turns out to be an "old coot" who does not at all meet her expectations.  They start to argue and list each other's personal faults, both claiming none was mentioned in each other's letters. With their mutual disinclination to continue with the marital union clear,  they jointly decide to call off the wedding.

With the marriage safely cancelled, he reveals to Susan that his letters were actually ghost-written as a joke by Ned Trent, the local saloon owner. Susan, rightly furious, confronts Ned to tell him off, in the process endearing herself to him.

Susan joins the Harvey Girls and she soon becomes their leader in fighting against the attempts by Trent's business associate, Judge Sam Purvis, to scare them away to maintain his own thriving business running the large saloon in town. The Harvey Girls also face the animosity of the so-called "dance-hall girls," led by Em, who is in love with Trent and sees Susan as a rival. 

Trent visits the Harvey House, sees its value along with the other trappings of civilization, and then tells Purvis to leave them alone. Purvis continues with his campaign of intimidation, finally burning down the restaurant. Trent offers his saloon as a replacement and Em and the dance-hall girls leave town. Susan, thinking that Trent too is leaving, gets on the train, but Em, seeing that Susan loves Trent so much that she is willing to give up everything for him, stops the train and points out Trent, riding toward them on his horse. Ultimately, they wed in the desert, surrounded by the Harvey Girls.

Cast

Cast notes:
 Byron Harvey Jr., the grandson of Fred Harvey of the Fred Harvey Company, has an uncredited role as a train conductor.
The Harvey Girls was the first reunion on film with Ray Bolger and Judy Garland since The Wizard of Oz (1939).

Production
The Harvey Girls was conceived by MGM as a dramatic vehicle for Lana Turner, but Roger Edens, of the Arthur Freed unit, decided after seeing the musical Oklahoma! that the story should be reworked as MGM's western musical with Judy Garland as its star. Garland wanted to work with Fred Astaire on Yolanda and the Thief, which was directed by fiancé Vincente Minnelli. Edens convinced her that the part in Yolanda was not large enough for her, and he promised that The Harvey Girls would be specifically created to showcase her talents.

Principal photography on The Harvey Girls  lasted from January 12 through June 4, 1945, a long production period. Studio filming was at MGM's Culver City studios, and the locations were in Victorville, California; at the Iverson Movie Ranch in Chatsworth (near Los Angeles); and in Monument Valley.

Singer Virginia Rees' voice was dubbed for  Angela Lansbury's songs. Cyd Charisse, who had her first speaking role in the film, had her singing dubbed by Marion Doenges.

Virginia O'Brien, a comic actress known for her deadpan style of singing, was pregnant while The Harvey Girls was filmed. Several scenes with Ray Bolger were never filmed due to the difficulty in hiding her pregnancy. This accounts for O'Brien's character disappearing after she sings "Wild Wild West".

The Harvey Girls was released in the United States on January 18, 1946.

Production credits:

 Art Direction – William Ferrari and Cedric Gibbons
 Set Decoration – Mildred Griffiths and Edwin B. Willis
 Costume Design – Irene Gibbons, Helen Rose, Valles
 Makeup Artist – Dorothy Ponedel
 Production Manager – Dave Friedman
 Assistant Director – George Rhein
 Sound Director – Douglas Shearer
 Special Effects – Warren Newcombe
 Choreographer – Robert Alton
 Musical director – Lennie Hayton
 Orchestrator – Conrad Salinger

Songs
The songs in The Harvey Girls were all written by Harry Warren (music) and Johnny Mercer (lyrics):

 "In the Valley (Where the Evening Sun Goes Down)" – Judy Garland
 "Wait and See" – Angela Lansbury (voice: Virginia Rees)
 "On the Atchison, Topeka and the Santa Fe" – Ben Carter, Marjorie Main, Ray Bolger, Judy Garland and chorus
 "The Train Must Be Fed" – Edward Earle, Selena Royle, Marjorie Main, Judy Garland and chorus
 "Oh, You Kid" – Angela Lansbury (voice: Virginia Rees)
 "Wait and See (reprise) – Kenny Baker
 "It's a Great Big World" – Judy Garland, Virginia O'Brien, Cyd Charisse (voice: Marion Doenges)
 "The Wild, Wild West" – Virginia O'Brien
 "Wait and See (second reprise) – Kenny Baker, Cyd Charisse (voice: Marion Doenges)
 "Swing Your Partner Round and Round" – Ray Bolger, Judy Garland, Marjorie Main, Cyd Charisse and chorus
 "In the Valley (Where the Evening Sun Goes Down) (reprise)" – Kenny Baker, Judy Garland

By far the biggest hit from the score of The Harvey Girls was "On the Atchison, Topeka, and the Santa Fe".  MGM released the song to record companies even before shooting was finished on the film, and it became an instant hit dominating the airwaves through the summer and fall of 1945, with versions by Bing Crosby with Six Hits and a Miss, Judy Garland and The Merry Macs, the Tommy Dorsey Orchestra with the Sentimentalists, and, the most popular, Johnny Mercer and The Pied Pipers. Mercer's version entered the Billboard charts on July 5, 1945, and stayed on it for 16 weeks, including seven straight weeks as No. 1 between July 28 and September 8.  Crosby's entered the charts on July 19 and stayed ten weeks, going as high as No. 4, while Dorsey's entered on August 2 and stayed for six weeks, peaking at No. 6.  Garland's hit the Billboard No. 10 position on September 20.  The song was also number 1 on Your Hit Parade for eight weeks running.

In shooting the number for the film, Garland reportedly did the entire song up to the tempo change in one take, twice, after watching her stand-in do one run-through.

Deleted songs

Cut from the film were three other songs written for it by Warren and Mercer: "March of the Doagies", "Hayride" and "My Intuition". "Doagies" was a production number featuring Garland; the outtake was included in That's Entertainment! III (1994). "My Intuition" was a duet for Garland and John Hodiak; this was also filmed and still survives in video format. "Hayride", sung by Garland and Ray Bolger, was prerecorded but not filmed.

Critical response
Howard Barnes wrote in the New York Herald Tribune that the film was "A great big animated picture postcard. Judy Garland is the film's bright ... star. Miss Garland is effectively glamorized in get-ups of the (18)90's and sings her songs pleasantly. The Harvey Girls is a perfect demonstration of what Hollywood can do with its vast resources when it wants to be really showy ... pretty girls – period sets and costumes – lilting tunes – super-speedy dance shuffles."

The New York Daily News said it was "A nostalgic whiff of the old west. Judy sings several sentimental ballads, as well as On the Atchison, Topeka, and the Santa Fe number. Her chief support in the way of real entertainment comes from Ray Bolger." Time wrote "A technicolored musical celebrating the coming of chastity, clean silverware, and crumbless tablecloths to the pioneer Southwest. The bearers of this culture, according to evidence presented here, were waitresses. The Harvey Girls is good fun in spots. Miss Garland doesn't seem as recklessly happy as she was in St. Louis but she still appears to be having a pretty fine time."

Box office
According to MGM records the film earned $4,112,000 in the US and Canada and $1,063,000.

Awards and honors
"On the Atchison, Topeka, and the Santa Fe" won an Academy Award for Best Original Song for Harry Warren and Johnny Mercer. In addition, Lennie Hayton's score was nominated for Best Music, Scoring of a Musical Picture, but did not win; the Oscar went to Morris Stoloff for The Jolson Story.

The film is recognized by American Film Institute in these lists:
 2004: AFI's 100 Years...100 Songs:
 "On the Atchison, Topeka and the Santa Fe" – Nominated
 2006: AFI's Greatest Movie Musicals – Nominated

References
Notes

Further reading

External links

 
 
 
 
 
 The Judy Garland Online Discography "The Harvey Girls" pages.

1946 films
1946 musical comedy films
1946 romantic comedy films
1940s romantic musical films
American musical comedy films
American romantic comedy films
American romantic musical films
Films that won the Best Original Song Academy Award
Films based on American novels
Films directed by George Sidney
Films produced by Arthur Freed
Films scored by Lennie Hayton
Films set on trains
Films set in the 1890s
Films set in the 19th century
Metro-Goldwyn-Mayer films
Fred Harvey Company
Films set in Utah
Films shot in Utah
1940s American films